György Kézdy (Krausz; 14 February 1936 – 8 February 2013) was a Hungarian actor, most notable for his role in the Hungarian television show Szomszédok (Neighbors). He committed suicide.

References

External links

1936 births
2013 suicides
Jewish Hungarian actors
Hungarian male television actors
Male actors from Budapest
Suicides by jumping in Hungary
Hungarian male film actors
2013 deaths